Tender Buttons may refer to

Tender Buttons (book), a 1914 book by Gertrude Stein
Tender Buttons (album), a 2005 album by British band Broadcast
Tender Buttons (press), an American avant garde poetry press